Aquatics at the 2011 Southeast Asian Games was held in Jakabaring Aquatic Center, Palembang, Indonesia for Swimming, Diving and Synchronized Swimming, Lumban Tirta Arena for Water Polo and Putri Island for Open Water Swimming.

Swimming at the 2011 Southeast Asian Games was held in Palembang, Indonesia from 12 to 17 November 2011. The competition featured 38 events (19 male, 19 female) swum in a long course (50m) pool. This was the first games to be held since non-textile swimsuits were banned in January 2010.

Women's water polo made its Southeast Asian Games debut in the 26th edition of the sporting event. Indonesia, Malaysia, and Singapore were the only teams to compete after the Philippines and Thailand withdrew.

Swimming

Men's events

Women's events

Medal table

Diving

Men

Women

Water polo

Open water swimming

Synchronized swimming

Medal table

References

2011 Southeast Asian Games events
2011 in swimming
2011
2011 in water sports